Midland Bank plc v Cooke [1995] is an English land law case, concerning constructive trusts; and at first instance (never appealed) proven undue influence in law as to a secured business loan and later refinance.

First, it clarified the law as to wedding gifts.

Second, it held that so long as some financial contribution, however, small can be identified as going to the purchase of a home, the court may quantify that contribution in a greater amount than initially given. It opted for a 50:50 division looking at both spouses' conduct in the round.

Third, it clarified that if proven the spouses had never discussed any details of joint ownership, where one spouse legally owns the whole family home then the court often should from equitable principles infer agreement as to proportions of their beneficial interests.

Facts

Mr Cooke paid £8500  at age 19 for the house the month before he was married. He achieved this through a mortgage loan from a bank, his own savings, and a pre-wedding gift from his parents of £1100. Mrs Cooke's parents paid for the wedding. The Cookes replaced that mortgage with one from Midland Bank plc to secure Mr Cooke's business overdraft. Mrs Cooke signed a consent form for her interest to be postponed to the bank's security. The property was put into Mr Cooke's name as sole legal owner. Midland Bank plc now demanded repayment of £52,000 and sought possession. Mrs Cooke argued her signature was obtained by undue influence. (Mrs Cooke admitted at trial that the married couple had never discussed any beneficial entitlement.)

The Judge held the bank knew of Mr Cooke's undue influence and that she had an equitable interest given that the wedding gift was partly hers. The bank did not (cross-)appeal on this finding. The bank cross-appealed by alleging that Mrs Cooke had a 0% interest. The Judge assessed her interest as 6% of the property, and Mrs Cooke appealed arguing for a 50% interest.

Judgment
The Court of Appeal held that the gift was made to the couple jointly (50:50). This was proof of a common intention to have a beneficial interest. But in quantifying her interest the financial contribution was not the only thing which mattered: the whole course of dealing did. On the facts it was clear that the presumed intention was that she should have an equal share of the beneficial interest. Waite LJ observed that people usually will not talk about legal entitlements to property when young and embarking on a relationship, and says that should not leave them ‘beyond the pale of equity’s assistance’. The parties shared everything equally, including ‘the upbringing of their children.’ He continued as follows.

Stuart-Smith LJ and Schiemann LJ concurred.

See also

English land law
English property law

References

English land case law
1995 in British law
1995 in case law
Court of Appeal (England and Wales) cases